Louis Coues Page (1869 – 1956) was a publisher in Boston, Massachusetts. Born in Zurich to American parents, he attended Harvard College and worked for Boston publishers Estes & Lauriat, 1891–1892. In 1896 he bought the Joseph Knight Company and renamed it L.C. Page & Company; around 1914 it became The Page Company. It issued works of "art, travel, music, belles lettres" and fiction for adults and children. It operated from offices on Beacon Street in Beacon Hill. Authors published by the firm included Bliss Carman, Julia Caroline Dorr, Lucy Maud Montgomery, and Eleanor H. Porter. In 1914 the Page Company acquired Dana Estes & Co.

Around the 1910s Louis and his brother George A. Page were co-owners of the Boston Braves baseball team.

Page married Kate Stearns in 1895.

Farrar, Straus & Cudahy acquired L.C. Page & Co. in 1957; the imprint continued until 1980.

References

External links
L.C. Page & Co.
 Open Library. L. C. Page & Company
 WorldCat. L.C. Page and Company
 Lucille Project. L.C. Page & Co.
 Directory of Directors in the City of Boston and Vicinity, 1909. Listing for George A. Page, L.C. Page & Company, 200 Summer St., Boston

The Page Company
 Library of Congress. Page Company
 Open Library. The Page Company
 Virtual International Authority File. Page Company
 Publishers Weekly. Advertisement, 1914

American book publishers (people)
Businesspeople from Massachusetts
People from Brookline, Massachusetts
1869 births
1956 deaths
Harvard College alumni
People from Zürich
Boston Braves owners